George Augustus Frederick FitzClarence, 1st Earl of Munster     (29 January 179420 March 1842), was an English peer and soldier.

Biography

The eldest illegitimate son of William IV of the United Kingdom and his long-time mistress Dorothea Jordan, he was well-educated, although his written English was poor (as was that of several of his royal uncles). Like his siblings, he had little contact with his mother after his parents separated in 1811, preferring to rely on his expectations from his father. He served as an army officer during the Peninsular War and subsequently in India. His father, though proud of his military record, was deeply concerned about his drinking and gambling, vices to which many of William's brothers were prone.

He was created Earl of Munster, Viscount FitzClarence and Baron Tewkesbury on 4 June 1831, and made a Privy Councillor in 1833. "Earl of Munster" had been a title held by his father before his accession to the British throne. George, like his siblings, was dissatisfied with the provisions made for him and this, combined with his increasing mental instability, caused a series of quarrels with his father, which ended in a complete breach in relations between them. The estrangement caused the King great distress, but those close to him thought it better that there be as little contact as possible, since Munster's visits invariably upset his father. Even the death of Munster's sister Sophia de L'Isle, the King's favourite child, in April 1837, did not bring about a reconciliation.

He gained the rank of major-general in the British Army and held the office of aide-de-Camp to his father King William IV between 1830 and 1837. He held the office of Lieutenant of the Tower of London between 1831 and 1833, was Constable and Governor of Windsor Castle between 1833 and 1842 and aide-de-Camp to Queen Victoria between 1837 and 1841. He was elected president of the Royal Asiatic Society in 1841.

Marriage and children
FitzClarence married Mary Wyndham (29 August 1792 – 3 December 1842), daughter of George Wyndham, 3rd Earl of Egremont, and his mistress Elizabeth Fox, on 18 October 1819. They had seven children:

 Lady Adelaide Georgiana FitzClarence (28 August 1820 – 11 October 1883); died unmarried.
 Lady Augusta Margaret FitzClarence (29 July 1822 – 5 September 1846); married Baron Knut Philip Bonde in Paris in 1844, died of childbed fever in Katrineholm, Sweden, one daughter (Ingeborg Augusta Sofia Bonde, 1846–1872).
 William George FitzClarence, 2nd Earl of Munster (19 May 1824 – 30 April 1901).
 Hon Frederick Charles George FitzClarence (1 February 1826 – 17 December 1878); married Adelaide Augusta Wilhelmine Sidney, daughter of his aunt Sophia FitzClarence; no issue.
 Lady Mary Gertrude FitzClarence (ca. 1832 – 1834); died in infancy.
 Captain Hon George FitzClarence (15 April 1836 – 24 March 1894); married Maria Henrietta Scott (d. 1912), had issue, including Charles FitzClarence. Grandfather of the 6th Earl of Munster and great-grandfather of the 7th (and last) Earl.
 Lieutenant Hon Edward FitzClarence (8 July 1837 – 23 July 1855); unmarried, died of wounds during the Siege of Sevastopol in the Crimean War.

Death
FitzClarence committed suicide at the age of 48 in London. He shot himself with a pistol presented to him by King George IV when Prince of Wales. The first shot only wounded his hand; while his footman went for help, having been told there had been an accident, Lord Munster put the gun in his mouth with his left hand and shot himself in the head. His suicide came as no surprise to his family who had long been concerned about his mental condition; his father's biographer attributes it to "a paranoiac sense of persecution." At his inquest, his doctor and a surgeon told the coroner that they believed he was going mad, and in recent years there has been speculation that he suffered from the probably hereditary malady of porphyria which had afflicted his grandfather and several other members of the family.

He was succeeded in the earldom and other titles by his eldest son, William.

Works
Memoirs of the Late War: Comprising the Personal Narrative of Capt. Cooke, the History of the Campaign of 1809 in Portugal, by the Earl of Munster, and a Narrative of the Campaign of 1814 in Holland (1831); An account of his experiences in the Peninsular War
Fahrasat al-kutub allatī narghabu an nabtāʻahā wa-al-masāyil allatī tuwaḍḍiḥu jins al-kutub allatī narghabu al-ḥuṣūl ʻalayhā innamā najhalu asmāyihā wa-al-masāyil fī ʻilm al-ḥarb (1840); on the art of Islamic warfare, a catalogue list of library desiderata in Arabic, Persian, Turkish, and Hindustani, compiled by Aloys Sprenger and commissioned by FitzClarence. 
Meadows of gold and mines of gems (translation from the Arabic 'Murudj al-dhaha'), (London, 1841); by Aloys Sprenger; English translation of the historical encyclopedia by the tenth-century Abbasid scholar al-Masudi dedicated to FitzClarence Earl of Munster. In his preface the Austrian orientalist acknowledges the earl's assistance correcting and rendering the Arabic into the English idom, and in the compilation of the notes.

Ancestry

References

External links 

1794 births
1842 deaths
Arabists
British Army generals
British Army personnel of the Napoleonic Wars
British orientalists
British politicians who committed suicide
British military personnel who committed suicide
Fellows of the Royal Society
George FitzClarence, 1st Earl of Munster
Illegitimate children of William IV of the United Kingdom
Members of the Privy Council of the United Kingdom
Peers of the United Kingdom created by William IV
Military personnel from London
Sons of kings
Presidents of the Royal Asiatic Society
Suicides by firearm in England
1